Ifan Nanda Pratama (born 29 March 2001) is an Indonesian professional footballer who plays as a centre back for Liga 1 club PSS Sleman.

Club career

PSS Sleman
Ifan signed with PSS Sleman to play in the Indonesian Liga 1 for the 2021 season. He made his professional league debut on 16 February 2022 in a match against Bali United at the Ngurah Rai Stadium, Denpasar.

Career statistics

Club

Notes

References

External links
 Ifan Nanda Pratama at Soccerway
 Ifan Nanda Pratama at Liga Indonesia

2001 births
Living people
People from Kudus Regency
Sportspeople from Central Java
Indonesian footballers
Liga 1 (Indonesia) players
PSS Sleman players
Association football defenders